Alar septum can refer to:
Greater alar cartilage
Lesser alar cartilages